Village Island is an island in the Johnstone Strait region of the Central Coast region of British Columbia, Canada, located on the northwest side of Turnour Island.

Its site is on Mahmalillikullah Indian Reserve No. 1. on Eliot Passage. The name means "village with rocks and islands out front", or as translated by famous chief and carver Mungo Martin,  "group of little islands" and by Franz Boas as "round things [islands] in front at beach".

See also
List of islands of British Columbia
Village (disambiguation)

References

Islands of British Columbia
Central Coast of British Columbia
Kwakwaka'wakw